Vexillum adornatum is a species of small sea snail, marine gastropod mollusk in the family Costellariidae, the ribbed miters.

Description
The white shell has chestnut bands, or is dark colored with white bands. The acute shell is oblong-fusiform. Its acute whorls show revolving striae between the ribs. The shell consists of nine whorls, angulate at the sutures. The anterior part of the body whorl is slightly umbilicate and recurved. The columella contains four plaits. The outer lip is slightly angulate.

Distribution

References

 Turner H. (2001) Katalog der Familie Costellariidae Macdonald 1860 (Gastropoda: Prosobranchia: Muricoidea). Hackenheim: Conchbooks. 100 pp.
 Patterson Edward, J. K.; Ravinesh, R. & Biju Kumar, A. (2022). Molluscs of the Gulf of Mannar, India and adjacent waters: A fully illustrated guide. Suganthi Devadason Marien Research Institute & Department of Aquatic Biology and Fisheries, University of Kerala. Tuticorin. i-xx, 1–524.

External links
 Tomlin, J. R. le B. (1920). On certain of Link's names in the Mitridae. The Nautilus. 33(4): 133-134

adornatum
Gastropods described in 1920